The 23rd Stinkers Bad Movie Awards were released by the Hastings Bad Cinema Society in 2001 to honour the worst films the film industry had to offer in 2000. The most nominated film of the year was Battlefield Earth with nine nominations, which also had eight wins. Worth noting is that there were no listed percentages of votes for each nominee; however, this would resurface with next year's ballot. Dishonourable mentions are also featured for Worst Picture (32 total).

Winners and nominees

Worst Picture

Dishonourable Mentions

 The Adventures of Rocky and Bullwinkle (Universal)
 Bamboozled (New Line)
 Big Momma's House (Fox)
 Bless the Child (Paramount)
 Boys and Girls (Miramax)
 The Cell (New Line)
 Charlie's Angels (Columbia)
 Coyote Ugly (Touchstone)
 The Crew (Touchstone)
 The Flintstones in Viva Rock Vegas (Universal)
 Godzilla 2000 (Sony)
 The Grinch (Universal)
 Hamlet (Miramax)
 Hanging Up (Sony)
 Hollow Man (Sony)
 I Dreamed of Africa (Sony)
 Mission to Mars (Touchstone)
 My 5 Wives (Artisan)
 The Next Best Thing (Paramount)
 The Ninth Gate (Artisan)
 Nutty Professor II: The Klumps (Universal)
 102 Dalmatians (Disney)
 Passion of Mind (Paramount)
 Pokémon: The Movie 2000 (Warner Bros.)
 Red Planet (Warner Bros.)
 Scary Movie (Dimension)
 Screwed (Universal)
 Snow Day (Paramount)
 Supernova (MGM)
 Thomas and the Magic Railroad (Sony)
 Vertical Limit (Sony)
 The Watcher (Universal)
 What Planet Are You From? (Sony)
 Whipped (Sony)

Other Categories

Films with multiple wins and nominations

The following films received multiple nominations:

Note: For each film with an asterisk, one of those nominations was the Founders Award.

The following films received multiple wins:

References

Stinkers Bad Movie Awards
Stinkers Bad Movie Awards